Nana Kofi Abuna V is the Paramount chief of Essipun in the Western Region of Ghana.

Early life and education 
Nana Kofi Abuna V was born in Takoradi on August 31, 1959. She was named Maame Ama Azaa Nyinpanyin at birth, but was known in school as Emma Theodora Wood. She attended Ashley's Secretarial College, where she obtained a diploma in English, shorthand, commerce, office practice and typing.

Chieftaincy 
She was enstooled as the chief of Essipun on December 19, 1998, after being named by the previous chief, Nana Kofi Abuna IV, as his regent. It is rumoured that she was selected after all the eligible male heirs rejected the offer to be enstooled as the next chief of the traditional area.  After her enstoolment as the chief of the area, she begun working as a businesswoman and an entrepreneur, in line with tradition which holds that the chief is not to be subordinate to anyone. Nana Kofi Abuna V is the only woman traditional leader among 22 males in the Sekondi traditional council.

Developmental works 
In 2003, she established an education fund in Essipun, which has supported over 30 needy children since its inception. Additionally, she self-financed a three-classroom nursery and kindergarten block in her community.

She has since 2004 been working towards gender parity in education in her traditional area. With the support of some partners like UNICEF, USAID, Regimanuel Gray Limited, Western Rural Bank and Lower Pra Rural Bank, she has also established a scholarship scheme, which provides support to girls within and around her community, through the basic to university level. Her Women Development Program secures loans for women from banks, to help them develop themselves and their businesses. Additionally, through her Women Leadership and Empowerment program, she organises workshops aimed at equipping women with leadership skills, to empower them to fully participate in public life, social change and democratic development.

Nana Kofi Abuna V is one of the several women traditional leaders whose leadership is being studied under a University of Ghana project titled "Women and Political Participation in Africa: A Comparative Study of Representation and Role of Female Chiefs", which is funded by the Andrew W. Mellon Foundation. In this project, a mixed-methods approach is adopted to comparatively study women’s representation in the institution of chieftaincy and their influence on women’s rights and wellbeing in Botswana, Ghana, Liberia, and South Africa. Lead researchers on the project, Peace A. Medie, Adriana A. E Biney, Amanda Coffie and Cori Wielenga, have also published an opinion piece titled "Women traditional leaders could help make sure the pandemic message is heard" in The Conversation news, which discusses how women traditional leaders can educate their subjects on Covid-19.

References 

People from Sekondi-Takoradi
1959 births
Living people
Ghanaian leaders
Tribal chiefs
Ghanaian women in politics
20th-century women rulers